Miguel Muñoz Mozún (19 January 1922 – 16 July 1990) was a Spanish football player and manager.

A midfielder, he spent the majority of his career at Real Madrid before going on to coach the club, where he is widely considered one of the most successful and greatest managers in football history, leading the team to two European Cup victories and nine La Liga titles (winning seven major titles in both major competitions combined as a player).

Muñoz later had a six-year coaching spell with the Spain national team, and led them to the final of Euro 1984.

Playing career
Born in Madrid, Muñoz played for various junior teams in the area, but initially failed to attract the attention of Real Madrid, going on to subsequently represent CD Logroñés, Racing de Santander and Celta de Vigo. In 1948 he, together with the likes of Pahiño, helped the latter finish fourth in La Liga and reach the Copa del Generalísimo final, where he scored in the 1–4 defeat to Sevilla CF.

The following season, both players signed for Real Madrid, and Muñoz went on to appear in 347 official matches with the club from the capital. Additionally, he won seven caps for Spain, but never appeared in any major tournament.

Muñoz scored Real's first ever goal in the European Cup, helping to a 2–0 away win against Servette FC on 8 September 1955. Subsequently, he captained the team in two consecutive competition wins in 1955–56 and 1956–57, and retired from football the following year at nearly 36.

Coaching career
Muñoz served a brief apprenticeship as coach of Real's reserve team, then named Plus Ultra CF, before being appointed coach of the main squad in 1959. His time in charge was one of the club's most successful eras as, under his guidance, it won the league nine times; this included a five-in-a-row sequence (1961–65) and another three consecutive.

On the European front, Muñoz led Real Madrid to two more wins in the European Cup, in 1959–60 and 1965–66. As a result, he became the first person to win the competition both as a player and a coach, which was later matched by Giovanni Trapattoni, Johan Cruyff, Carlo Ancelotti, Frank Rijkaard, Pep Guardiola and Zinedine Zidane; he left in 1974 after 16 seasons, as the side's longest-serving and most successful coach.

After seven more club seasons (Granada CF, UD Las Palmas and Sevilla FC), Muñoz took the reins of the Spain national team after their group stage exit in the 1982 FIFA World Cup, on home soil. Previously, he had had a four-game interim spell in the late 60s, and eventually led the country to the UEFA Euro 1984 runner-up place, as well as the quarter-finals of the 1986 World Cup.

Death
Muñoz died in Madrid aged 68, from bleeding due to esophageal varices.

Honours

Player
Real Madrid
La Liga: 1953–54, 1954–55, 1956–57, 1957–58
Copa Latina: 1955, 1957
European Cup: 1955–56, 1956–57, 1957–58

Manager
Real Madrid
La Liga: 1960–61, 1961–62, 1962–63, 1963–64, 1964–65, 1966–67, 1967–68, 1968–69, 1971–72
Copa del Generalísimo: 1961–62, 1969–70
European Cup: 1959–60, 1965–66
Intercontinental Cup: 1960

Individual
France Football 14th Greatest Manager of All Time: 2019

Managerial statistics

References

External links

1922 births
1990 deaths
Footballers from Madrid
Spanish footballers
Association football midfielders
La Liga players
Segunda División players
CD Logroñés footballers
Racing de Santander players
RC Celta de Vigo players
Real Madrid CF players
Spain B international footballers
Spain international footballers
Spanish football managers
La Liga managers
Segunda División managers
Real Madrid Castilla managers
Real Madrid CF managers
Granada CF managers
UD Las Palmas managers
Sevilla FC managers
Spain national football team managers
UEFA Euro 1984 managers
1986 FIFA World Cup managers
UEFA Euro 1988 managers
UEFA Champions League winning managers
UEFA Champions League winning players